Kristina Lindblom (born 20 August 1992) is an Australian handball player for Ludvika Handball Club and the Australian national team.

References

1992 births
Living people
Australian female handball players